Chelsea Halfpenny (born 26 September 1991) is an English actress, known for her roles as Amy Wyatt in the ITV soap opera Emmerdale and Alicia Munroe in the BBC drama Casualty. She played Jenna Hunterson in the 2022 UK Tour of Waitress.

Early life
Halfpenny attended St Augustine's Primary School in Leam Lane, Gateshead and then went on to attend St Edmund Campion Catholic School in Wrekenton, both of which her aunt, Jill Halfpenny, attended. She also attended Saturday fame school classes at the Reavley Theatre School, Gateshead. Halfpenny lived on the Leam Lane Estate, in Gateshead.

Career

Television and film
Halfpenny's professional acting career began in 2004 when she appeared in the Casualty episode "What Parents Do", Playing an eleven-year-old girl called Karine. In the same year, she booked  role as Lucy Summerbee in popular children's television series Byker Grove. Halfpenny secured the role after answering an advertisement in the Newcastle Evening Chronicle. after leaving Byker Grove in 2006, Halfpenny continued to work in the North East. She featured In an independent short film for Sham Films, called Cherry Pop.

Halfpenny featured in the 2010 short film Compulsion, directed by Andy McVicar. She Played the female lead Kelly, In  Story of young adolescent love. The film was funded by Northern Film and Media's Digital Nation initiative fund. Made for £20,000, Compulsion won the British Council award for "Best New Short Film'" at the London Film Festival. On 8 October 2010, Halfpenny made her first appearance on Yorkshire-based soap opera Emmerdale as runaway teenager Amy Wyatt, who became a regular character. On 11 October 2013, Halfpenny confirmed that she was to leave Emmerdale. Her last episode was shown on 14 November 2013. Later in 2013, Halfpenny portrayed Sarah in a short film called Lilium, a production by students at Teesside University.

In 2015, Halfpenny joined the cast of BBC medical drama Casualty. She portrayed the role of Alicia Munroe, a year 1 foundation officer doctor. Halfpenny's first episode aired on 19 September 2015. Halfpenny had signed for eight episodes and departed the show on 14 November 2015, but in May 2016, it was announced that Halfpenny would return to Casualty, with her return episode airing on 30 July 2016. On 15 January 2019, it was confirmed that Halfpenny would be leaving Casualty after four years.

Music and theatre
In 2009, Halfpenny progressed to the Open Mic UK national finals with Newcastle-based girl-band Vevo. In 2011, Halfpenny featured on a DVD release by MWM Records, called Big River Big Songs. She sang a solo of "I Still Love Him" and sang a duet, "The Shoe Makker" with fellow Emmerdale cast member Charlie Hardwick. Both songs sung by Halfpenny were made for paid download on iTunes on 12 March 2012.

In 2012, Halfpenny took part in Sunday for Sammy, a biannual charity concert held in aid of the Sammy Johnson Memorial Fund, which benefits young performers in the Newcastle area. Starring alongside Angela Lonsdale and Denise Welch, Halfpenny played Lambrini, a young Newcastle woman on community service. In 2014, she appeared in a variety of roles in the West Yorkshire Playhouse production of Maxine Peake's Beryl – celebrating the sporting achievements of cyclist Beryl Burton. In 2019, it was announced that she would be taking over the role of Judy in 9 to 5: The Musical, as part of the West End theatre production. In late 2020 it was announced Halfpenny would star in the UK Wide Tour of Waitress in the role of Jenna.

Personal life
Halfpenny is the daughter of Newcastle DJ Paula Halfpenny and the niece of actress Jill Halfpenny. In 2018, she began dating actor James Baxter, and they announced their engagement on 13 June 2021.

Filmography

Film

Television

Awards and nominations

References

External links
 

1991 births
Actresses from Northumberland
English child actresses
English film actresses
English soap opera actresses
English television actresses
Living people
Actors from Gateshead
Actresses from Tyne and Wear